Canillas de Esgueva is a municipality located in the province of Valladolid, Castile and León, Spain. According to the 2004 census (INE), the municipality has a population of 113 inhabitants.

Notable people
Aquilino Bocos (born 1938), cardinal of the Catholic Church

References

Municipalities in the Province of Valladolid